Amit Malviya is an Indian politician serving as the national convener of the IT cell of the Bharatiya Janata Party.

Early life 
Malviya is from Prayagraj, Uttar Pradesh. He completed his BBM from Dayalbagh Educational Institute and PGDM Finance Management from Symbiosis Institute of Management Studies Symbiosis International University. He went on to work in the banking sector for a number of years.

Bharatiya Janata Party 
In 2009, Malviya gained prominence in the BJP through the forum 'Friends of BJP'. Following this he was made the head of the BJP IT Cell.

Several social media posts by Malviya were criticized for being misinformation. In December 2020, Twitter flagged a tweet by Malviya about the farmers' protest as 'manipulated media'.

References

Further reading 
 

Bharatiya Janata Party politicians from Uttar Pradesh
Year of birth missing (living people)
Living people